The Rolls-Royce Spectre is a full-size electric luxury car manufactured by Rolls-Royce Motor Cars. The first deliveries of the car will arrive in Q4 2023.

It will be Rolls-Royce's first EV and will ride on the same platform as the Phantom and Cullinan.

Overview

The Spectre's design is very similar to today’s Rolls-Royce Wraith coupe, also having the suicide doors similar to the Wraiths.

The earliest prototypes showed a drag coefficient of just 0.25, making it the most aerodynamic shape Rolls-Royce ever created. The drag coefficient is expected to improve during the product's testing protocols undertaken in 2022.

The Spectre will have a redesigned Spirit of Ecstasy, the flowing robes (often mistaken for outstretched wings) will be reshaped for a realistic look with a lower, more dynamic stance which will make her more aerodynamic. This brings her much closer to the original drawings made in the early years of the 20th century. This iteration of the Spirit of Ecstasy will appear on all future models succeeding the Spectre.

History 
In September 2021 Rolls-Royce announced the Spectre and confirmed that testing had commenced. On 18 October, 2022, the marque unveiled the Spectre through its social media channels. The Spectre follows a longtime tradition at Rolls-Royce of giving their models supernatural monikers.

References

External links 
 Official website

Cars introduced in 2022
Rolls-Royce Motor Cars vehicles
Rolls-Royce
Electric car models
Electric cars
Luxury vehicles
Battery electric vehicles